The 1974–75 Boise State Broncos men's basketball team represented Boise State University during the 1974–75 NCAA Division I men's basketball season. The Broncos were led by head coach Bus Connor, in his second full season, and played their home games on campus at Bronco Gymnasium in Boise, Idaho.

League champion Montana nearly knocked off eventual national champion UCLA in the Sweet Sixteen of the NCAA tournament.

Junior center Pat Hoke was named to the all-conference team; junior guard Terry Miller and freshman guard Steve Connor were honorable mention.

There was no conference tournament yet; it debuted the following year, and Boise State won it.

References

External links
Sports Reference – Boise State Broncos – 1974–75 basketball season

Boise State Broncos men's basketball seasons
Boise State